Troy is a Turkish card scheme founded in 2015 by the Interbank Card Center. It is the only domestic card scheme in Turkey. Troy offers financial services, including credit card, debit card, and prepaid card issuing and network processing. Since 2017, Troy cards have been accepted in the United States on the Discover Card network.

Within the card reciprocal agreements, Troy cards are also accepted on the Diners Club and Discover Card networks.

References

External links 
 

Banking in Turkey
Credit card issuer associations
Debit card issuer associations
2015 establishments in Turkey